Son of Albert is the only studio album by Andrew Ridgeley. Originally released in May 1990, Ridgeley's effort was a sharp turn away from his former pop image with Wham! years earlier. Focusing more on guitars and drums, the critical reaction to Ridgeley's attempt at a solo record was mixed. After rather unimpressive sales from Son of Albert, Ridgeley gradually quit playing music professionally.

Two singles from the album, "Red Dress" and "Shake", were released in 1990 with little success (with the exception of a top twenty hit in Australia for the latter). Another song, "Mexico", was scheduled to be released as the album's third single, but was dropped.

Ridgeley's album is named after himself, as the son of Albert Ridgeley.

In January 2018, a remastered and expanded edition of the album was released in the UK on Cherry Red Records.

Reception

Entertainment Weekly praised the instrumental "verve" of the songs, but criticized them for lacking conviction: "Ridgeley seems to have redefined himself as a kick-in-the-pants rock & roller, but his songs still come out sounding like manufactured pop."

Track listing
All songs arranged and produced by Andrew Ridgeley and Gary Bromham, unless noted otherwise. The 2018 Expanded Edition includes the original album tracks from the vinyl, CD, and Cassette release, plus extra bonus tracks.

Personnel

Musicians
 Andrew Ridgeley – lead vocals, additional vocals, Spanish vocals on "Mexico", voice box
 Mary Cassidy, Lauren Fownes, Brie Howard, Miss Johnny, George Michael (on "Red Dress"), Tessa Niles – additional vocals
 Gary Bromham, Dan McCafferty, Mark "Bobby" Robinson – Spanish vocals on "Mexico"
 Robert Ahwai, Gary Bromham, Phil Palmer – guitars
 Tony Barnard, Michael Cozzi – acoustic and electric guitars
 Hugh Burns – Spanish guitar on "Mexico", acoustic and electric guitars
 Gary Masters – keyboards
 Mark Feltham – harmonica
 Graham Edwards, Deon Estus, Davey Faragher, Jerry Ferguson, Paul Gray – bass
 Danny Thompson – Spanish vocals on "Mexico", electric bass, double bass
 Gary Bromham, Pat Torpey, Paul Ridgeley – drums
 Laurence Cottell, Dave O'Higgins, Paul Spong – horns
 Danny Cummings – percussion
 Richard Gibbs – voice box

Production
 Engineered by Harvey Birrell, Jacques Erhardt, Gordon Fordyce, Paul Gomersall, Martyn "Max" Heyes, Russell Leahy, Gary Wilkinson, and Perry Cleveland-Peck
 Mixed at Amazon Studios, Liverpool; Comforts Place, Lingfield; Mayfair Studios, London, and Olympic Studios, London
 Mixed by Paul Gomersall, Martyn "Max" Heyes, and Tim Weidener
 Photography by Julian Broad
 Album design by Andrew Ridgeley and Simon Halfon
 Management: Lippman Kahane Entertainment
 Recorded at Comforts Place, Lingfield; Compass Point, Nassau; Eden Studios, London, England; EMI/Pathé Studios, Paris, France; Galaxy Sound Studio, Los Angeles; Ground Control, Los Angeles; Great Linford Studios, Great Linford; Maison Rouge, London; Mayfair Studios, London; Olympic Studios, London; Terminal 24, London, and Skylight Studios, London

Chart performance

Album

"Shake" single

References

1990 debut albums
Andrew Ridgeley albums
Columbia Records albums